Kim Đồng Publishing House (Vietnamese: Nhà xuất bản Kim Đồng) is the largest book producer and publisher for Vietnamese children. With more than a thousand titles of books published yearly, its books are offered to children of all ages, providing a wide range of collections and genres from literature, science, art, history to comics, pop-up and board books. The publisher was named after a young martyr Kim Đồng.

Overview
Besides working with local authors and artists, Kim Dong publishing house has been expanding their co-operation with more than 70 foreign publishers to find new topics and book types. Amongst those publishers, they have been working closely with Dorling Kindersley, HarperCollins UK, Simon and Schuster UK, Dami International, Shogakukan Inc., Seoul Publishing House, etc.

Together with publishing and producing, Nhà xuất bản Kim Đồng is also the holder of many movements of books, comics, songs, poems, creation for the children. The publisher also takes part in many social events, such as the Doraemon Scholarship Fund, supporting maintain of Bà mẹ Việt Nam anh hùng (literally meaning Heroic Vietnamese Mother), building book collections for the poor Vietnamese communes, building schools for the people in mountainous regions, etc.

Currently, the Publisher's head office was located at the address: number 55, Quang Trung street, Hanoi. Its two branches are located at number 169, Trần Phú street, Đà Nẵng and at number 268, Nguyễn Đình Chiểu street, Ho Chi Minh City.

The publishing house was founded on 17 June 1957. Its General Director is Mr Pham Quang Vinh. There are around a hundred staff, a thousand titles per annum, and 12,000,000 copies of books per annum. Genres include literature, art, science, comics, etc.

Creation of Kim Đồng Publishing House
Right after its establishment, the government of North Vietnam paid attention to the education of children, and considered arts and literature as the most important parts in the new generation's education.

In the years 1945–1946, children's books were published at Hanoi by Hội Văn hóa Cứu quốc (National Salvating Culture Association) and Nhà xuất bản Cứu quốc (National Salvation Publishing house).  After the outbreak of the First Indochina War, in 1948 the books were published at Việt Bắc war zone by the partnership of Tủ sách Kim Đồng (Kim Đồng Bookshelf) and "Hoa kháng chiến" Publisher. The war ended in 1954, and Tủ sách Kim Đồng continued to publish books as a part of Nhà xuất bản Thanh niên (Youth Publishing House).

Then, at the Second Letters and Arts Congress (February 1957), creating books for children was stated as a very important mission for Vietnam, hence in this congress people started to prepare for an establishment of a new publisher particularly serve the Vietnamese children and junior citizens.

Not very long after that, on March 16, 1957, a meeting about establishing a publisher for children was held at the head office of Hội Văn nghệ Việt Nam (Vietnam's Letters and Arts Association), with the participation of 12 people who then became the founders of the new publisher.

The new publisher was officially founded on June 17, 1957, with the name Nhà xuất bản Kim Đồng (Kim Đồng Publishing House).  The name "Kim Đồng" was proposed by the writer Tô Hoài, as Kim Đồng is also the name of a famous teenage revolutionary martyr. The new publisher was considered as the successor of the former Kim Đồng Bookself.  The first General Director was the well-known writer and drama-writer Nguyễn Huy Tưởng. The foundation of the publisher was announced in the daily newspapers on the next day.

The first head office of the publisher was at the number 55, Quang Trung street, Hai Bà Trưng District, Hanoi.

Some notable works published by Kim Đồng Publishing House

Local Works 

Dế mèn phiêu lưu ký (The Adventures of a Cricket), a well-known fiction of Tô Hoài.
Đất rừng phương Nam (The Southern forest land).
Lá cờ thêu sáu chữ vàng (The flag embroidered with the six golden words)
Góc sân và khoảng trời (The yard corner and the sky interval), a poem-collection created by the well-known Vietnamese poet Trần Đăng Khoa
Kính Vạn Hoa (The Kaleidoscope), a well-known fiction of Nguyễn Nhật Ánh.

Foreign comic 
Kim Đồng Publishing House is one of the largest manga publishers in Vietnam

Other 

 TKKG, was published in 1994–1996 with the name "Tứ quái TKKG" (The four strange people, TKKG)
 Little House on the Prairie, published in 2019.

References

External links
 Official website

Publishing companies established in 1957
Book publishing companies of Vietnam
Companies based in Hanoi
Manga distributors
Vietnamese companies established in 1957